James Enoch Hill (October 30, 1929 – August 8, 2018) was a sport shooter from the United States. He won a silver medal in the 50 metre rifle prone event at the 1960 Summer Olympics in Rome.

Hill was a gunnery sergeant with the United States Marine Corps. In 1956 he won the National Service Rifle Championship, and in 1957 the Pershing Trophy at the NRA Championships in the free rifle team event. Hill died on August 8, 2018 in Carlinville, Illinois.

References

1929 births
2018 deaths
Sportspeople from Chicago
American male sport shooters
United States Distinguished Marksman
ISSF rifle shooters
Olympic silver medalists for the United States in shooting
Shooters at the 1960 Summer Olympics
Medalists at the 1960 Summer Olympics
20th-century American people
21st-century American people